Christopher Ferguson Rufo (born August 26, 1984) is an American conservative activist and senior fellow at the Manhattan Institute. He is best known for his activism against critical race theory, which he says "has pervaded every aspect of the federal government" and poses "an existential threat to the United States". He is a former documentary filmmaker and former fellow at the Discovery Institute, the Claremont Institute, The Heritage Foundation, and the Foundation Against Intolerance and Racism.

Rufo has been actively involved in Republican efforts to restrict critical race theory instruction or seminars. Critical race theory considers racism to be systemic in various rules and laws, and not only based on individuals' prejudices. Rufo described his strategy to oppose critical race theory as using the term to "put all of the various cultural insanities under that brand category" and "to have the public read something crazy in the newspaper and immediately think 'critical race theory.

Rufo opposes teachers discussing LGBTQ issues in schools. He has contended that public schools are often "hunting grounds for sexual predators." He has said that "To get to universal school choice, you really need to operate from a premise of universal public school distrust."

Early life 
Rufo was raised in Sacramento by Dino F. Rufo and Nanette Ferguson Rufo, both attorneys. His father was born in San Donato Val di Comino, Italy, and his mother is of Scottish ancestry.  He graduated from Sacramento-area Rio Americano High School in 2002. Rufo received a Bachelor of Science in Foreign Service from Georgetown University's Walsh School of Foreign Service in 2006. In 2022, he earned a Master of Liberal Arts in Extension Studies from Harvard Extension School, an open-enrollment institution which is a continuing education division of Harvard University.

Career and activism 
Rufo was a visiting fellow for domestic policy studies at The Heritage Foundation and a Lincoln Fellow at the Claremont Institute. Later, he was a research fellow at the Discovery Institute, a Christian think tank known for its opposition to the theory of evolution and advocacy for intelligent design to be taught in public schools.

He was a documentary filmmaker in his twenties and early thirties, with overseas projects such as "Roughing It: Mongolia", and a film about basketball in Xinjiang called "Diamond in the Dunes". 

In 2017, Rufo was one of 30 plaintiffs in a lawsuit that successfully prevented Seattle from imposing a 2.25% income tax on sums above $250,000 a year for individuals and over $500,000 for couples. In 2018, he briefly attempted a run for the Seattle City Council.

In April 2022, Rufo was reported to have 2,500 paid subscribers to his newsletter. The Southern Poverty Law Center (SPLC) has described Rufo as a "far-right propagandist".

Rufo was one of several conservative education activists appointed by Florida Governor Ron DeSantis to the board of trustees of New College of Florida in January 2023.

Anti-critical race theory activism 

Rufo's views on race and poverty became more conservative while working as director on the 2019 documentary "America Lost", co-produced by PBS and WNET for the series "Chasing the Dream: Poverty and Opportunity in America". From 2016 through 2019, Rufo's investigation into poverty in rust belt cities that had declined dramatically following periods of prosperityYoungstown, Ohio, Memphis, Tennessee, and Stockton, Californialeft him with the view that poverty stemmed from "social, familial, even psychological [dynamics]" and could not be solved by public policy. Rufo said that the 2016 United States presidential election challenged ineffective establishment responses to poverty and drew attention to these cities. In his 2018  Discovery Institute-funded policy paper "Seattle Under Siege: How Seattle’s Homelessness Policy Perpetuates the Crisis and How We Can Fix It," Rufo wrote that four groups"socialist intellectuals", "compassion brigades", the "homeless-industrial complex", and the "addiction evangelists" had successfully framed the debate on homelessness and diverted funding to their projects, with the "compassion brigade" calling for social justice using terms such as "compassion, empathy, bias, inequality, root causes, systemic racism."

Rufo strongly opposes critical race theory in governmental and other publicly-funded institutions, which he has referred to as a kind of "cult indoctrination". Rufo contended in 2020 that "critical race theory has pervaded every institution in the federal government".

Critical race theory considers the idea that racism is systemic, in that laws, policies, regulations, and even court decisions create and continue historical racial prejudices in the United States. Rufo described his strategy to oppose critical race theory as intentionally using the term to conflate various race-related ideas in order to create a negative association. Rufo said that "[w]e will eventually turn [critical race theory] toxic, as we put all of the 'various cultural insanities' under that brand category. The goal is to have the public read something 'crazy' in the newspaper and immediately think 'critical race theory'." Rufo has described intersectionality as "a hard left academic theory that reduces people to a network of racial, gender and sexual orientation identities and intersect in complex ways and determine whether you are an oppressor or oppressed". However, according to Kimberlé Crenshaw, an influential figure in critical race theory, what Rufo and Republicans "are calling critical race theory is a whole range of things, most of which no one would sign on to, and many of the things in it are simply about racism".

Through interviews with Tucker Carlson on Fox News, Rufo reportedly influenced the Trump administration to issue an executive order to prohibit federal agencies from having diversity training that addressed topics such as systemic racism, white privilege and critical race theory. The administration described such programs as "divisive, anti-American propaganda". The ban was revoked by President Joe Biden on his first day in office. Divisions continued at the state level, with Republican legislators putting forward bans on critical race theory. Rufo has appeared multiple times on Tucker Carlson Tonight and The Ingraham Angle. According to New Yorker writer Benjamin Wallace-Wells, Rufo's story on racially divided bias-training sessions in Seattle was a "phenomenon" that "helped to generate more leaks from across the country" about the contents of courses and diversity training programs.

According to The Washington Post, Snopes and New York, Rufo has misrepresented contents of diversity training programs and course curricula. For example, he falsely claimed that a diversity consultant hired by the U.S. Treasury Department had "told employees essentially that America was a fundamentally white supremacist country", and urged them to "accept their white racial superiority"; however, the diversity consultant had said no such thing. Rufo denies the Washington Posts characterizations, saying, "This is an absurd position that only an ideologue could believe." Rufo has also falsely claimed that a course curriculum in California called on students to honor the Aztec gods of human sacrifice and to commit "countergenocide" against white Christians, which the curriculum did not do. He also falsely claimed that a document by an Oregon school district "calls for adopting the educational theories of Brazilian Marxist Paulo Freire" and advocates turning students against the Marxist "revolution's enemies" and into the "liberated masses". However, the document had no reference to revolution, its enemies, or the liberated masses. It only referenced Freire's call to treat education as an act of liberation and mutual humanization. Rufo claimed that staff resources at the school district "assumes" that whites are born racist; however, the document only urged teachers to move beyond the "belief that you aren't racist if you don't purposely or consciously act in racist ways".

In March 2022 an article in Salon detailed a talk about Rufo's favored education policy that he made at Hillsdale College and described it as similar to Viktor Orbán's education policy for Hungary during his second premiership.

Opposition to LGBTQ instruction 

Rufo has been a prominent advocate for bans on teachers discussing LGBTQ issues in classrooms. He supported Florida House Bill 1557 (The Florida Parental Rights in Education Act, sometimes referred to as the "Don’t Say Gay" bill), which prohibits teachers from discussing such matters in kindergarten through the third grade. Rufo appeared alongside Florida Governor Ron DeSantis when he signed a bill retaliating against Disney after the company criticized the Florida Parental Rights in Education Act.

Rufo linked LGBTQ discussions at schools to grooming, the act of connecting with children for the purpose of sexually abusing them. He said that schools were "hunting grounds" for teachers and that parents had "good reason" to worry about grooming. However, the data that Rufo used to come to this conclusion "is completely invalid", according to the original studies' authors. Some critics maintain that Rufo's rhetoric has "echoes of slanders from decades ago that gay teachers were a threat to children." After Disney criticized the Florida Parental Rights in Education Act, Rufo suggested that Disney was involved in sexualizing children and that the company was rife with child sexual abuse.

Writing for Salon, education journalist and political science lecturer Kathryn Joyce has argued that Rufo's claims about public school teachers and pedophilia are part of his goal to "generally foster so much anger against public schools that it drives a nationwide popular movement to privatize education". Rufo's goal in privatizing education, according to school board member and public-school advocate Amy Frogge, also in Salon, is "very well-developed by PR firms. It's a billionaire's movement, and I believe that all the controversy about critical race theory and those issues are being stirred up in order to drive a 'failing schools' narrative.’ … The only way the privatization movement can gain ground is to create controversy and distrust of the public school system". Similarly, president of the American Federation of Teachers Randi Weingarten has claimed that Rufo and others who wish to privatize "public education are using Big Lies to undermine public schools." Rufo has said that "To get to universal school choice, you really need to operate from a premise of universal public school distrust."

Rufo opposes "socio-emotional learning", saying that it "serves as a delivery mechanism for radical pedagogies such as critical race theory and gender deconstructionism." Socio-emotional learning, which promotes self-awareness, self-management, responsible decision-making, social awareness and relationship building, was a fairly uncontroversial pedagogical technique before it was targeted by Republicans and Rufo.

Personal life 
He is married to Suphatra Kip Paravichai, a Thai-American who was once a computer programmer at Amazon Web Services. They live in Gig Harbor, Washington, with their three sons.

References 

 

1984 births
Living people
Georgetown University alumni
American non-fiction writers
American journalists
American film directors
American documentary film directors
Conservatism in the United States
The Heritage Foundation
Discovery Institute fellows and advisors
Manhattan Institute for Policy Research
Harvard University alumni
Education activists